Abu'l-Barakāt al-Baghdādī, a golden age philosopher
 Abul barakat ibn Kabar, a mameluke Coptic encyclopaedist
 Abul Barkat (economist), from Bangladesh